Matthew James Nicholson (born 2 October 1974) is an Australian former cricketer who played in one Test match in 1998 and over 100 first-class games for New South Wales, Western Australia, Northamptonshire and Surrey.

A native of the Sydney suburb of St Leonards, he attended Knox Grammar School and began playing for the Gordon club in the Sydney competition who he later captained. His career was ravaged by injuries as well as chronic fatigue syndrome, following a dose of Glandular Fever but a strict diet enabled him to manage the problem, and he became a vital part of WA's and New South Wales' bowling line-ups. In 1998 Nicholson earned a surprise call up to play his one and only Test against England in Melbourne.

In 2004/05 Nicholson claimed 47 wickets in the Pura Cup, including 7 in the final, as NSW won the title. In 2007 he played for Surrey having previously played County Cricket with Northamptonshire in 2006.  He was released by Surrey after an unsuccessful 2008 to allow Shoaib Akhtar in.

He announced his retirement in March 2008 with NSW's game against South Australia being his last. Following his retirement, Nicholson was appointed as a selector for the New South Wales team. He is the Director of Cricket at Newington College.

See also
One Test Wonder

References

External links

1974 births
Living people
People with chronic fatigue syndrome
People educated at Knox Grammar School
Staff of Newington College
Australia Test cricketers
New South Wales cricketers
Western Australia cricketers
Northamptonshire cricketers
Surrey cricketers
Australian cricketers
Cricketers from Sydney